The following is a partial list of radio stations in Palau.

According to The World Factbook,  there are six radio stations in Palau: 1 A.M., 1 shortwave & 4 F.M.

AM
1584/T8AA Koror (News/Talk) Palauan
Shortwave
T8BZ - KHBN
T8WH - World Harvest Radio International
FM
87.9/T8AA-FM Koror (News/Talk) Palauan
88.5/T8BZ-FM Koror
88.9/T8?? Koror (Music) Palauan
89.5/T8?? Koror (News/Talk/Music) Palauan (formerly WWFM)

References
CIA - The World Factbook - Palau

Radio stations in Palau
Palau